The Campeonato Argentino de Clubes de Básquet (English: Argentine Championship of Basketball Clubs) was the top-tier level division professional basketball championship in Argentina, until 1984, when it was replaced by the Liga Nacional de Básquet (LNB).

History

The competition was established in 1936, with the purpose of organizing a basketball competition for men's clubs. Until then, there was only a tournament where provincial sides took part, as a part of local leagues, such as the Torneo Metropolitano, for teams of Buenos Aires.

The Campeonato Argentino was organised by the Argentine Basketball Confederation (CABB), with the first two editions being played on the YMCA's clay courts, in Buenos Aires. After four editions were held in Buenos Aires, the Campeonato Argentino was also played in Córdoba, Mendoza, Rosario, Tucumán, San Juan, Salta, and Jujuy. In 1939, the CA was held in Bahía Blanca (renamed "the capital of Argentine basketball"), with 15 teams taking part in it.

The last edition of the competition was held in 1984, and was won by Deportivo San Andrés, a club from General San Martín Partido, after they defeated River Plate in the finals.

Obras Sanitarias, Lanús, and San Lorenzo, are the only current LNB teams that won the CA championship at least once.

Champions

Titles by club

References

1936 establishments in Argentina
Basketball leagues in Argentina
Defunct basketball leagues
Defunct sports leagues in Argentina
Sports leagues established in 1936
Sports leagues disestablished in 1984